Princess Daisy is a 1980 bonkbuster novel by American author Judith Krantz.

Plot summary
The novel tells the story of Princess Marguerite "Daisy" Valensky. She is the daughter of Prince Alexander "Stash" Valensky, a wealthy Russian-born polo player and former playboy, and his wife Francesca Vernon, a beautiful and talented American actress. Stash and Francesca, madly in love, are thrilled by her pregnancy and the news that she is carrying twins. However, a problem during delivery denies one of the twin girls, named Danielle, enough oxygen, and she is born brain-damaged, while Daisy is healthy. Francesca suffers from acute post-partum depression and enters a fugue state for several weeks. Stash, who has a fear and disgust of illness and abnormality after a childhood spent watching his mother slowly waste away from tuberculosis, is unable to accept or love Danielle. When Francesca recovers from her depression, he lies to her, telling her that the second-born twin died soon after birth. She discovers the truth and flees with both infants to California, where she is helped by her former agent and his wife. For several years, she lives a secluded life in Carmel and grants Stash short visits with Daisy.

Francesca dies in a car accident, and Daisy and Dani are reunited with their father, who immediately places Dani in an expensive but remote home for retarded children, much to Daisy's distress.  When Daisy turns 16, her father dies in a plane accident, after which her older half-brother, Ram, who has become obsessed with her, seduces and then brutally rapes her. To get her away from Ram, her father's mistress, Anabel (a mother figure to the girl), sends her to the University of California at Santa Cruz, where she forms what will be a lifelong friendship with Kiki Kavanaugh, an auto industry heiress from Grosse Pointe, Michigan. Because of Daisy's total estrangement from Ram, who is a trustee of her inheritance, she neglects to read his letters regarding her stock portfolio at a crucial moment and thus loses everything her father left her.  As a result, she is forced to drop out of college and go to work. She paints portraits of rich, horse-mad people's children on ponies in order to pay Dani's bills and also works in a demanding job at a production company that makes television commercials.

When Anabel becomes ill and needs money for treatment, Daisy must make a decision to abandon her private life. Up to this point, Daisy has lived out of the public eye, refusing to trade on her title for financial gain, but she ultimately accepts an opportunity to do so. In the process, Daisy must learn to trust a man who loves her, to come to terms with her sister's disability, and to make peace with the life she has been given.

Reception
The book hit number one a week before publication on The New York Times Best Seller List. Rights to the paperback edition were sold for $3.2 million, the highest price ever paid for a fiction reprint at that time. The book received a scathing review by Clive James.

Adaptation
Princess Daisy was adapted into a 1983 miniseries of the same name.

References

1980 American novels
American romance novels
Novels by Judith Krantz
American novels adapted into television shows